Trstenik is a village in central Croatia.

References

Populated places in Zagreb County